Jesus Jones are a British alternative rock band from Bradford-on-Avon in Wiltshire, formed in late 1988, who continue to record and perform, as of 2021. Their track "Right Here, Right Now" was an international hit, and was subsequently globally licensed for promotional and advertising campaigns. The single was also nominated for a Grammy award at the 34th Annual Grammy Awards in 1991, as was its album, Doubt. They also achieved chart success with the songs "Real Real Real", "International Bright Young Thing" and "Info Freako".

Career

Formation and Liquidizer (1986–1989)
Incorporating elements of electronic music styles such as house and techno to an indie rock format, along with fellow British groups such as The Shamen, Pop Will Eat Itself and EMF, Jesus Jones were one of the leading purveyors of the early 1990s alternative dance scene. In late 1988, while on holiday in Spain, Mike Edwards, Gen, and Al Doughty decided to leave the band they were in at the time, and form their own band. The name of the band came about when they realised that they were three "Joneses" sitting on a beach in Spain surrounded by people called Jesus.
Back in London they advertised in the music press for a guitarist, and Jerry De Borg joined the band. Edwards had recently met Iain Baker in a pub in North London, they had got talking as they recognised each other as skateboarders, due to their footwear. Edwards asked Baker to join as the keyboardist and the line-up was complete.

They achieved initial critical acclaim with their 1989 album Liquidizer, and in particular, the single "Info Freako", which featured buzzing rock guitars with samples and a hip-hop sensibility, relatively new at the time. The track was particularly championed by Bruno Brookes on his BBC Radio 1 programme.

Doubt and Perverse (1990–1995)
In the spring of 1990, Jesus Jones recorded their second album, Doubt, but their record label was forced to delay its release until the beginning of 1991. The album sold well, due to the success of "Right Here, Right Now". The song is about the swift end of the Cold War, and reached No. 2 in the US and No. 31 in the UK. In June 1990, Jesus Jones appeared at the Glastonbury Festival.

Other singles from Doubt included "Real, Real, Real" and "International Bright Young Thing", which became two of their biggest hit singles in the UK, reaching No. 19 and No. 7 respectively in the UK Singles Chart. In 1991, Jesus Jones were the only UK winners when they won the Best New Artist award at the MTV Awards. In April 1991, the British music magazine NME reported that their US tour had sold out before Jesus Jones arrived in the country.

The follow-up to Doubt was Perverse (1993), a darker and more industrial based album, which, though a big seller, did not reach the worldwide hit status of Doubt. Perverse was one of the first rock albums recorded entirely digitally.

Already and London (1996–2003)
After the release of the Perverse album, Jesus Jones took an extended hiatus and did not return to the recording studio until December 1996. After the recording of their fourth album, drummer Gen left the band before the album was released. They released their fourth album, titled Already, in 1997 after which Jesus Jones and their record label EMI parted company. The final months of the band are chronicled in the PDF book written by Mike Edwards "Death Threats From An 8 Year Old In The Seychelles", which was available for a time from the band's website. The band remained in contact and came back with a new drummer Tony Arthy with the low-selling London in 2001 on the indie record label Mi5 Recordings. EMI issued Never Enough: the Best of Jesus Jones, a greatest hits compilation album whilst the band moved from the North American-only Mi5 to the newly established Mi5 Recordings UK.

Later activities (2004–present)
With the exception of the release of the Culture Vulture EP in 2004, no new material from the band had been released between 2001 and 2018. However, in 2010, a series of download albums were released to Amazon.co.uk. The release consisted of six different albums containing "in concert" performances at the BBC. Most were EPs but a few were live albums.

The single "Right Here, Right Now" was resurrected in 2006 as an advertising jingle for the American retailer Kmart, in an image campaign for CBS News, and in promotional advertisements for the now defunct television channel, TechTV. Ford Motors was using "Right Here, Right Now" in their 2010 televisual advertising campaign. A cover of the song was also recorded by New Zealand band The Feelers to use in advertising for the 2011 Rugby World Cup. 
In 2011 the band released The Collection & Other Rarities, which included many of their B-side tracks as well as demos and rarities.

In November 2014 EMI reissued all four of the band's albums in a special CD+DVD bundle. In addition to the original album's tracks the reissues feature radio sessions, long-deleted b-sides, rare remixes and alternate versions. The DVDs include rare live concert footage and other extras.

In a 2015 interview for the online periodical Soot Magazine band leader Mike Edwards acknowledged that, besides re-recording some older tracks with new arrangements, he was in the process of writing material for a new album: "I am writing new stuff – I was actually writing some new material yesterday and I have loads of little bits and pieces ticking over."

Since the mid-2000s, Jesus Jones have continued performing live.  In August 2011 the band went on a short tour (dubbed on one poster "The World's Smallest World Tour"), playing three shows in Australia before closing with a show in Japan. In November 2011 the band were due to perform in the UK in Birmingham and London, but the dates were postponed due to bass player Al Doughty being ill. They took place in January 2012. The band also toured the UK in December 2013 as part of The Wonder Stuff's Sleigh The UK tour. In March 2015 the band again returned to Australia and New Zealand for a five city tour.

On 24 December 2013 the band announced the resignation of drummer Tony Arthy. Having been with the band for 13 years, Arthy had replaced original drummer Simon "Gen" Matthews who had left after the rocky completion of Already. On 1 January 2014 the band announced that Matthews would be rejoining the band.

The band announced that a new album called Passages would be released in 2017.  On 9 November 2017, Iain Baker posted an update via PledgeMusic.com that the album release was being postponed until 20 April 2018 due mainly to the logistics of the release.  The album was finally released 20 April 2018 via PledgeMusic.

Band members
 Mike Edwards (born Michael James Edwards, 22 June 1964, Educated at St Laurence Secondary School in Bradford on Avon, Witshire, England) (London) – vocals, guitars, keyboards (1988–present)
 Jerry De Borg (born Jerry de Abela Borg, 30 October 1960, Kentish Town, London) – guitars (1988–present)
 Al Doughty (born Alan Jaworski, 31 January 1966, Plymouth) – bass (1988–present)
 Iain Baker (born Iain Richard Foxwell Baker, 29 September 1965, Carshalton, Surrey) – keyboards, programming (1988–present)
 Gen (born Simon Edward Robert Matthews, 23 July 1964, Devizes, Wiltshire) – drums, additional percussion (1988–1997 then 2014–present)

Former members
 Tony Arthy – drums (1999–2013)

Discography

Studio albums

Compilation albums
1993 Scratched: Unreleased Rare Tracks & Remixes (Japan only)
1999 Greatest Hits
2002 Never Enough: The Best of Jesus Jones
2011 The Collection: A Selection of Band Favourites and Rarities
2018 Voyages
2018 Zeroes and Ones: The Best of Jesus Jones (2-CD compilation)
2022 Some of the Answers (15-CD boxed set)

EPs

Singles

Video albums
1991 Big in Alaska

Other
1990 Live (a.k.a. Move Mountains & 4 More) (US-only live EP)
1991 Live in Alaska (German-only live VHS)
1993 A Perverse Conversation with Jesus Jones (US-only interview promo)
1993 Zeroes & Heroes (Double EP)
1997 4 Track Sampler for Promo Only (Promo EP)
1998 Back 2 Back Hits (US-only 'Best of' with EMF)
2002 Never Enough The Best of Jesus Jones (Videos DVD)
2003 Live at the Marquee (Live DVD)
2005 Live at the Marquee (Live download album)
2008 The Remixes (Remix download album)
2010 BBC in Concert 26th February 1991 (Live download album)

References

Further reading

External links
 Official website
 Archive of gigs, discography, history & photos
 Allmusic entry for Jesus Jones

English alternative rock groups
English electronic music groups
Musical groups established in 1986
Musical groups from London
Alternative dance musical groups
1986 establishments in the United Kingdom